The U-18 European Baseball Championship, formerly the European Junior Baseball Championship, is a biennial, under-18 international baseball tournament sanctioned and created by the Confederation of European Baseball (CEB). The tournament is conducted in the year prior to the 18U Baseball World Cup (formerly called the World Junior Baseball Championship), which is likewise held every other year. The top 4 teams in the European Junior Baseball Championship qualify for the World Cup.

Results

Medal table

See also
 European Baseball Championship

References

 
European Baseball Championship
Youth baseball competitions
WBSC Europe competitions
European championships